Emily Benenson (born 1957) is an American figure skater.  She competed in pairs with partner Johnny Johns, and the duo won a bronze medal at the 1973 U.S. Figure Skating Championships.  After their partnership ended, she paired with Jack Courtney.

Competitive Highlights
(with Courtney)

(with Johns)

(with Johns)
1973
U.S. Championships - 3rd

(with Courtney)
1975
U.S. Championships - 3rd
1976
U.S. Championships - 3rd

References

1957 births
Living people
American female pair skaters
21st-century American women
20th-century American women